Yolanda Ordaz de la Cruz (1963 – 26 July 2011) was a crime reporter that had worked for nearly three decades for Notiver, the largest-circulation newspaper in Veracruz, Mexico. She was kidnapped on July 24, 2011, and her corpse was found beheaded two days later in the neighbor port town of Boca del Río. The crime hasn't been solved, there have been no detentions and different hypothesis exist. The general attorney in the state of Veracruz, Reynaldo Escobar, said that the investigation was considering the alleged relationship of some journalists with the organized crime. Notiver saw these declarations as a menace to journalists and linked the slaying to Ordaz's investigation of the murder of three colleagues a month earlier.

Background

Yolanda Ordaz de la Cruz was the fourth journalist killed in Veracruz in 2011, in the context of the Mexican Drug War. The first was Noel López Olguín in March. On July 20, Notiver crime columnist Miguel Ángel López Velasco, his wife, and their son Miseal López Solana, who also worked at Notiver as a crime photographer, were murdered in their home. In 2012 drug trafficking related violence increased in Veracruz, including the murder of Proceso'''s journalist Regina Martínez in April and the killing of four media professionals in May, including Guillermo Luna Varela, who had been colleague of Ordaz at Notiver.

The state of Veracruz is faced with crime primarily from Los Zetas drug cartel. Since early 2010, there have been multiple shootings and gunfights that have broken out from the territorial fight between Los Zetas and the Gulf Cartel.

Ordaz had been a close friend to the López family as she and Miguel López had worked together for years. Just a week before her death, Yolanda Ordaz had questioned the general attorney Reynaldo Escobar because of the lack of results in the investigation about her colleagues' murders. At the time of her own murder, she was looking into her co-workers' deaths.

Death
Yolanda Ordaz received several letters with death threats before she was killed. The journalist was reported missing by her relatives on Sunday night July 23, 2011. She had told them she was going out to cover a story and never returned home. On Tuesday July 26, 2011, her body decapitated was found with signs of torture, and her head was found behind the offices of the Imagen del Golfo news station, in Boca del Río. There was note written in Spanish saying "Friends can also betray you. Sincerely, Carranza." Juan Carlos Carranza, former transit police officer and allegedly a local leader of Los Zetas, had been signaled by the general attorney as the main suspect of the murder of the family López Velasco.

The case is open and the motivations of the crime are still unclear. The day after the murder general attorney Reynaldo Escobar said Ordaz's murder was a settling of scores between crime gangs, but he didn't present any proof. Journalist  also published in his column similar allegations. Notiver requested publicly the resignation of Escobar for these declarations  A few days after the crime the Mexican army killed two alleged drug cartel members, and the prosecutor said that one of them had an identification of Yolanda Ordaz. Also, a couple of accusatory videos were published anonymously in Internet, mentioning Ordaz as a mediator for Los Zetas. Other journalists speaking under anonymity said to McClatchy that López and Ordaz may have been passing information to military intelligence and were killed by crime gangs in vengeance.

Reactions
Many reporters for the Notiver'' newspapers went into hiding or were not showing up for work after 3 of their co-workers have been killed in the last two months.

Ordaz's murder outraged the reporting community, and they demanded a thorough investigation of the deaths of their fellow employs to be able to bring their killers to justice.

Director-General of UNESCO Irina Bokova said, "The latest case in an increasing global trend of women journalists being targeted, which I am deeply concerned about. It is essential that the authorities investigate the alarming number of attacks on reporters in Veracruz and bring their culprits to justice."

See also

List of journalists killed in Mexico

References 

1963 births
2011 deaths
Crime journalists
Deaths by firearm in Mexico
Assassinated Mexican journalists
Journalists killed in the Mexican Drug War
Mexican women journalists
Women crime writers
2011 murders in Mexico